HPI is a British vehicle history checking service founded in 1938 and part of UK automotive data business cap hpi.

The company was started to prevent the wrongful sale of hire-purchase cars and was the first organization of its kind. HPI works alongside the police, DVLA, finance and insurance companies to generate detailed vehicle history reports for consumers in the second-hand car market.  The report, called HPI Check, informs consumers whether a vehicle has outstanding finance, been stolen, written off as a total loss, has a mileage discrepancy (clocked), had a plate change, been cloned, or has an outstanding logbook loan. The HPI Check can be performed on any vehicle that is registered in the UK with the DVLA, including caravans and quad bikes. In 2008, HPI were acquired by Solera. HPI Headquarters are currently situated in Leeds.

HPI Check 
HPI Check is a vehicle history check service provided by HPI (formerly known as Hire Purchase Information) in the UK. HPI originated the vehicle history check in 1938. The HPI Check produces a report that provides information about a vehicle's history, mainly if it has outstanding finance, or if it is written off, stolen or clocked. You can also see all the specs, tax checks and other basic vehicle data.

References

External links
New campaign urges used car buyers to 'check it not regret it.'
Mileage discrepancy could affect 2.5m vehicles in the UK
Car clocking warning as mileage cheating hits an all-time high

Automotive industry in the United Kingdom
Organizations established in 1938
Service companies of the United Kingdom
Driving in the United Kingdom